4,4'-Diapophytoene desaturase (dehydrosqualene desaturase, CrtN, 4,4'-diapophytoene:FAD oxidoreductase) is an enzyme with systematic name . This enzyme catalyses the following chemical reaction

 15-cis-4,4'-diapophytoene + 4 FAD  all-trans-4,4'-diapolycopene + 4 FADH2 (overall reaction)
(1a) 15-cis-4,4'-diapophytoene + FAD  all-trans-4,4'-diapophytofluene + FADH2
(1b) all-trans-4,4'-diapophytofluene + FAD  all-trans-4,4'-diapo-zeta-carotene + FADH2
(1c) all-trans-4,4'-diapo-zeta-carotene + FAD  all-trans-4,4'-diaponeurosporene + FADH2
(1d) all-trans-4,4'-diaponeurosporene + FAD  all-trans-4,4'-diapolycopene + FADH2

This enzyme is typical of Staphylococcus aureus and some other bacteria such as Heliobacillus sp.

References

External links 
 

EC 1.3.8